Francis Noyes (1814 – circa 1855) was an English first-class cricketer active 1842–48 who played for Nottinghamshire. He was born in England and died in California. He played in 21 first-class matches.

References

1814 births
1855 deaths
English cricketers
Nottinghamshire cricketers
North v South cricketers
Midland Counties cricketers
Gentlemen of England cricketers
Gentlemen of Nottinghamshire cricketers
Surrey Club cricketers